Defence Force Sport Club (Amharic: መከላከያ "Mekelakeya") is an Ethiopian football club based in the city of Addis Ababa. They play in the Ethiopian Higher League, the second division of professional football in Ethiopia. The team, formerly named Army SC and Mechal SC, is the second most decorated club in Ethiopian football history behind Saint George.

History 
Mekelakeya is historically the second most successful club in Ethiopian football history with 11 top division titles, with the most recent coming in 1989. Their dominance in the early years of Ethiopian football was cemented with six titles in the span of eight years from 1949 to 1956. After relative dormancy in the 1960s and 1970s, the club returned to its dominant ways in the 1980s by winning four titles. The club also has enjoyed success in the Ethiopian Cup, winning it 13 times. Defense beat Hawassa City 2–0 to win the 2015 Ethiopian Cup for a record 13th time and for the second time in three years.

Defense entered the 2017 CAF Confederation Cup as the runners-up in the 2016 Ethiopian Cup. They were knocked out of the tournament by Cameroonian side Yong Sports Academy 2–1 on aggregate in the preliminary round. On April 30, 2018 the club was involved in a match where they were awarded a goal that their opponents, Welwalo Adigrat University, disputed. An altercation followed that ultimately led to a member of the Welwalo coaching staff physically attacking the referee. In April 2021, the club was promoted back into the Ethiopian Premier League after a successful campaign in the second division.

Crest

Stadium 
The club plays its home matches at Addis Ababa Stadium.

Departments

Active Departments 

 Women's Football Team
 Football Team (U17)
 Football Team (U20)

Honors

Domestic 
Ethiopian Premier League: 11
1949, 1951, 1952, 1953, 1954, 1956, 1976, 1982, 1984, 1988, 1989

Ethiopian Cup: 14

1946, 1949, 1950, 1951, 1954, 1955, 1956, 1975, 1982, 1990, 2006, 2013, 2015, 2018

African
African Cup of Champions Clubs: 1 appearance
1977 – First Round

CAF Confederation Cup: 2 appearances

2007 – First Round

2017 – Preliminary Round

CAF Cup Winners' Cup: 1 appearance
1976 – Quarter-finals

Players

First-team squad

Former Managers 
  Geberemedhin Haile

Former Players 

  Awol Abdellah
  Bedaso Hora
 Seyoum Kebede
 Faud Ibrahim

References

External links
Team profile – ethiofootball.com
Team profile – soccerway.com

Football clubs in Ethiopia
Football clubs in Addis Ababa
1938 establishments in Ethiopia
Association football clubs established in 1938
Military association football clubs in Ethiopia